This is a list of countries that have participated in the Miss Supranational pageant (until 2022 edition).

Entrants 2009–present

{|border="2" cellpadding="2" cellspacing="0" style="margin: 0 1em 0 0; background: #f9f9f9; border: 1px #aaa solid; border-collapse: collapse; font-size: 90%;" class="wikitable sortable"
|-bgcolor="efefef"
! Country/Territory 
! Debut
! Participations
! Yearscompeted
! Nationaltitle
! Placements
! Best placement
! First placed
! Last placed
! Notes
|-
| 
| 2009
| 12
| 2009-2021
| Miss Universe Albania
| 2
| Top 20
 Anisa Mukaj(2010)
| (2010)
 Anisa Mukaj(Top 20)
| 2017
 Alessia Çoku(Top 25)
| Won Miss Talent 2009; Top Model 2017.
|-
| 
| 2014
| 3
| 2014, 2016-2017
| Miss Angola
| 0
| -
| -
| -
| -
|-
| 
| 2013
| 6
| 2013-2014, 2016, 2018-2019, 2022-present
| Miss Argentina
| 3
| Top 20
 Marisol Arrillaga(2014)
| 2014
 Marisol Arrillaga(Top 20)
| 2019
 Avril Marco(Top 25)
| Won Best Body 2013; Top Model 2016.
|-
| 
| 2010
| 1
| 2010
| Miss Armenia
| 0
| -
| -
| -
| -
|-
| 
| 2015
| 1
| 2015
| Miss Aruba
| 0
| -
| -
| -
| -
|-
| 
| 2013
| 7
| 2013-2019
| Miss Universe Australia
| 6
| Top 10
 Christiana Fischer(2015)
| 2013
 Esma Voloder(Top 10)
| 2018
 Maddison Clare(Top 25)
| Won Miss Supranational Asia and Oceania 2012; Miss Supranational Oceania 2018; Top Model Oceania 2018.
|-
| 
| 2009
| 2
| 2009, 2013
| Miss Azerbaijan
| 0
| -
| -
| -
| -
|-
| 
| 2009
| 5
| 2009-2011, 2013, 2021
| Miss Bahamas
| 1
| Top 15
 Kendra Demetria Wilkinson(2009)
|(2009)
 Kendra Demetria Wilkinson(Top 25)
|(2009)
 Kendra Demetria Wilkinson(Top 25)
| Won Miss Congeniality 2009, 2021; Miss Personality 2009, 2010.
|-
| 
| 2019
| 1
| 2019
| Miss Universe Barbados
| 0
| -
| -
| -
| -
|-
| 
| 2009
| 11
| 2009-2019
| Miss Belarus
| 6
| Winner
 Ekaterina Buraya(2012)
| 2009
 Marina Lepesha(1st Runner-up)
| 2018
 Margarita Martynova(Top 25)
| Won Miss Supranational Europe 2013; Top Model Europe 2018.
|-
| 
| 2010
| 12
| 2010-present
| Miss Belgium
| 3
| Top 12
 Louise-Marie Losfeld(2021)
| 2010
 Chloe De Groote(Top 20)
| 2021
 Louise-Marie Losfelds(Top 12)
| Won Miss Internet 2010; Miss Elegance 2018; Miss Photogenic 2021; Top Model Europe 2021.
|-
| 
| 2012
| 1
| 2012
| Miss Belize
| 0
| -
| -
| -
| -
|-
| 
| 2010
| 12
| 2010-present
| Miss Bolivia
| 2
| Top 24
 Macarena Castillo(2022)
| 2017
 Romina Rocamonje(Top 25)
| 2022
 Macarena Castillo(Top 24)
| -
|-
| 
| 2011
| 1
| 2011
| Miss Bonaire
| 0
| -
| -
| -
| -
|-
| 
| 2012
| 1
| 2012
| Miss Bosne i Hercegovine
| 1
| Top 20
 Emma Golijanin(2012)
| 2012
 Emma Golijanin(Top 20)
| 2012
 Emma Golijanin(Top 20)
| -
|-
| 
| 2009
| 13
| 2009-present
| Miss Brasil
| 9
| Top 10
 Luciana Bertolini(2010)
 Raquel Benetti(2013)
 Bárbara Reis(2018)
| 2009
 Karine Louise Osorio Pires(Top 15)
| 2022
 Giovanna Reis(Top 24)
| Won Miss Supranational Americas 2009, 2013, 2018, 2021; Best National Costume 2011; Top Model 2018 & Top Model Americas 2018.
|-
| 
| 2009
| 3
| 2009-2011
| Miss Bulgaria
| 0
| -
| -
| -
| -
|-
| 
| 2022
| 1
| 2022
| Miss Cambodia
| 0
| -
| -
| -
| -
|-
| 
| 2010
| 3
| 2010, 2013, 2019
| Miss Cameroon
| 1
| Top 25
 Angèle Kossinda(2019)
| 2019
 Angèle Kossinda(Top 25)
| 2019
 Angèle Kossinda(Top 25)
| Won Miss Supranational Africa 2019.
|-
| 
| 2010
| 12
| 2010-present
| Miss Universe Canada
| 4
| 1st runner-up
 Siera Bearchell(2015)
| 2012
 Katie Starke(Top 20)
| 2015
 Siera Bearchell(1st runner-up)
| Won Miss Congeniality 2010, 2022; Miss Top Model 2012; Miss Friendship 2014; Global Beauties´Woman of Substance 2015.
|-
| 
| 2014
| 2
| 2014, 2017
| Miss Cape Verde
| 0
| -
| -
| -
| -
|-
| 
| 2014
| 7
| 2014-2017, 2019-present
| Miss Universo Chile
| 2
| Top 20
 Charlotte Molina Rios(2014)
| 2014
 Charlotte Molina Rios (Top 20)
| 2015
 Tina Schnitzer(Top 25)
| -
|-
| 
| 2009
| 10
| 2009-2010, 2013-2018, 2021-present
| Miss China World
| 0
| -
| -
| -
| Won Top Model 2014; Top Model Asia 2021.
|-
| 
| 2010
| 11
| 2010-2011, 2013-present
| Miss Colombia
| 8
| 1st runner-up
 Tica Martinez(2017)
| 2010
 Marcela Marín(Top 20)
| 2022
 Valentina Espinosa(Top 12)
| Won Miss Supranational Americas 2022.
|-
| 
| 2012
| 9
| 2012-2019, 2022
| Miss Costa Rica
| 2
| Top 10
 Nicole Menayo(2017)
| 2012
 Karina Ramos Leitón(Top 20)
| 2017
 Nicole Menayo(Top 10)
| Won Miss Supranational Americas 2017.
|-
| 
| 2009
| 8
| 2009-2011, 2015-2019
| Miss Universe Croatia
| 1
| Top 15
 Andreja Cavlović(2009)
| 2009
 Andreja Cavlović (Top 15)
| 2009
 Andreja Cavlović (Top 15)
| -
|-
| 
| 2012
| 2
| 2012, 2022
| Miss Cuba
| 0
| -
| -
| -
| Won Best National Costume 2012.
|-
| 
| 2011
| 3
| 2011, 2015, 2022
| Miss Curaçao
| 0
| -
| -
| -
| -
|-
| 
| 2009
| 1
| 2009
| Miss Cyprus
| 0
| -
| -
| -
| -
|-
| 
| 2009
| 13
| 2009-present
| Czech Miss
| 7
| 1st runner-up
 Hana Verná(2010)
| 2010
 Hana Verná(1st runner-up)
| 2022
 Kristýna Malířová (Top 12)
| Won Miss Photogenic 2012, 2015; Miss Supranational Europe 2014, 2019; Top Model 2022.
|-
| 
| 2009
| 10
| 2009-2016, 2018, 2022-present
| Miss Danmark
| 2
| Top 20
 Julia Prokopenko(2012)
| 2012
 Julia Prokopenko(Top 20)
| 2018
 Celina Riel (Top 25)
| Won Miss Elegance 2009; Miss Supranational Europe 2012; Miss Photogenic 2014.
|-
| 
| 2009
| 12
| 2009-2015, 2017-present
| Miss Dominican Republic
| 5
| 4th runner-up
 Eoanna Constanza(2021)
| 2011
 Sofinel Baez Santos(Top 10)
| 2021
 Eoanna Constanza (4th runner-up)
| Won Miss Supranational Americas 2011; Miss Supranational Caribbean 2019; Miss Elegance 2011
|-
| 
| 2010
| 12
| 2010-present
| Miss Ecuador
| 3
| 4th runner-up
 Sulay Castillo(2012)
| 2012
 Sulay Castillo(4th runner-up)
| 2022
 Valery Carabali (Top 24)
| Won Best Body 2012; Miss Photogenic 2017
|-
| 
| 2011
| 3
| 2011, 2015-2016
| Miss Egypt
| 0
| -
| -
| -
| -
|-
| 
| 2011
| 9
| 2011, 2013-2018, 2021-present
| Reinado de El Salvador
| 1
| Top 24
 Linda Maya Sibrián Minero(2021)
| 2021
 Linda Maya Sibrián Minero (Top 24)
| 2021
 Linda Maya Sibrián Minero (Top 24)
| -
|-
| 
| 2009
| 13
| 2009-2016, 2018-present
| Miss England
| 2
| 4th runner-up
 Amanda Lillian Ball(2009)
| 2009
 Amanda Lillian Ball(4th runner-up)
| 2012
 Rachael Howard(Top 20)
| Won Best Body 2009; Miss Elegance 2014.
|-
| 
| 2011
| 6
| 2011, 2013-2015, 2018-2019
| Miss Equatorial Guinea
| 1
| Top 25
 Maria Lucrecia Nve Maleva(2018)
| 2018
 Maria Lucrecia Nve Maleva (Top 25)
| 2018
 Maria Lucrecia Nve Maleva (Top 25)
| Won Miss Supranational Africa 2014; Miss Personality 2015.
|-
| 
| 2010
| 6
| 2010-2015
| Miss Estonia
| 0
| -
| -
| -
| Won Miss Moto Show 2015.
|-
| 
| 2011
| 4
| 2011, 2016-2017, 2019
| Miss Ethiopia
| 1
| 3rd runner-up
 Bitaniya Josef(2017)
| 2017
 Bitaniya Josef (3rd runner-up)
| 2017
 Bitaniya Josef (3rd runner-up)
| -
|-
| 
| 2010
| 9
| 2010-2011, 2013-2014, 2017-present
| Miss Finland
| 1
| Top 20
 Johanna Ahlback(2010)
| 2010
 Johanna Ahlback(Top 20)
| 2010
 Johanna Ahlback(Top 20)
| Won Best Body 2010; Miss Photogenic 2019.
|-
| 
| 2009
| 13
| 2009-present
| Miss France
| 3
| Top 10
 Analisa Kebaili(2011)
| 2011
 Analisa Kebaili(Top 10)
| 2021
 Judith Brumant-Lachoua (Top 24)
| Won Miss Supranational Europe 2011.
|-
| 
| 2011
| 1
| 2011
| Miss Tahiti
| 1
| Top 20
 Mihilani Teixeira(2011)
| 2011
 Mihilani Teixeira (Top 20)
| 2011
 Mihilani Teixeira (Top 20)
| Won Miss Personality 2011.
|-
| 
| 2012
| 4
| 2012-2015
| Miss Gabon
| 2
| 2nd runner-up
 Maggaly Nguema(2014)
| 2013
 Hilary Ondo(Top 20)
| 2014
 Maggaly Nguema (2nd runner-up)
| Won Miss Supranational Africa 2013.
|-
| 
| 2010
| 1
| 2010 
| Miss Gambia
| 1
| Top 20
 Fatou Khan(2010)
| 2010
 Fatou Khan (Top 20)
| 2010
 Fatou Khan (Top 20)
| Won Miss Supranational Africa 2010.
|-
| 
| 2010
| 5
| 2010-2013, 2015
| Miss Georgia
| 0
| -
| -
| -
| -
|-
| 
| 2009
| 10
| 2009-2010, 2012-2013 2015-2017, 2019-present
| Miss Universe Germany
| 0
| -
| -
| -
| -
|-
| 
| 2013
| 4
| 2013, 2015, 2021-present
| Miss Ghana
| 1
| Top 24
 Gifty Boakye(2022)
| 2022
 Gifty Boakye (Top 24)
| 2022
 Gifty Boakye (Top 24)
| Won Miss Talent 2021; Supra Influencer 2022.
|-
| 
| 2014
| 4
| 2014-2017
| Miss Gibraltar
| 1
| Top 30
 Natalia Nunez(2015)
| 2015
 Natalia Nunez (Top 30)
| 2015
 Natalia Nunez (Top 30)
| Won Miss Elegance 2015.
|-
| 
| 2009
| 7
| 2009-2011, 2014, 2018, 2021-present
| Star GS Hellas
| 2
| Top 15
 Dimitra Alexandraki(2009)
| 2009
 Dimitra Alexandraki(Top 15)
| 2010
 Margarita Papandreou (Top 20)
| -
|-
| 
| 2013
| 7
| 2013-2018, 2021
| Miss Guadeloupe
| 0
| -
| -
| -
| -
|-
| 
| 2009
| 5
| 2009-2010, 2018-2019, 2022-present
| Miss Guatemala
| 2
| Top 24
 María Fernanda Milián(2022)
| 2019
 Andrea Radford (Top 25)
| 2022
 María Fernanda Milián(Top 24)
| Won Best National Costume 2018.
|-
| 
| 2010
| 1
| 2010
| Miss World Guinea
| 0
| -
| -
| -
| -
|-
| 
| 2016
| 2
| 2016, 2021
| Miss Guyana
| 0
| -
| -
| -
| -
|-
| 
| 2010
| 7
| 2010, 2013, 2016, 2018-present
| Miss Haiti
| 1
| Top 24
 Pascale Bélony(2021)
| 2021
 Pascale Bélony (Top 24)
| 2021
 Pascale Bélony (Top 24)
| Won Miss Supranational Caribbean 2021; Best National Costume 2018; Top Model Caribbean 2018.
|-
| 
| 2009
| 6
| 2009-2013, 2019
| Miss Honduras
| 3
| 3rd runner-up
 Ruth Aleman Alvarado(2009)
| 2009
 Ruth Aleman Alvarado(3rd runner-up)
| 2012
 Natalya Coto Hernández (Top 20)
| -
|-
| 
| 2011
| 4
| 2011, 2013, 2015, 2022-present
| Miss Hong Kong
| 1
| Top 24
 Kumiko Lau(2022)
| 2022
 Kumiko Lau (Top 24)
| 2022
 Kumiko Lau (Top 24)
| Won Miss Congeniality 2011.
|-
| 
| 2010
| 9
| 2010-2016, 2018-2019
| Magyarország Szépe
| 2
| 4th runner-up
 Korinna Kocsis(2016)
| 2011
 Ágnes Konkoly(Top 20)
| 2016
 Korinna Kocsis (4th runner-up)
| Won Miss Supranational Europe 2016.
|-
| 
| 2010
| 9
| 2010-2015, 2019-present
| Miss Iceland
| 2
| 3rd runner-up
 Tanja Ýr Ástþórsdóttir(2015)
| 2015
 Tanja Ýr Ástþórsdóttir(3rd runner-up)
| 2019
 Hugrún Birta Egilsdótti(Top 25)
| Won Miss Bikini 2013.
|-
| 
| 2011
| 11
| 2011-present
| Miss Diva
| 10
| Winner
 Asha Bhat(2014)
 Srinidhi Shetty(2016)
| 2011
 Michelle Almeida(Top 20)
| 2022
 Ritika Khatnani(Top 12)
| Won Miss Supranational Asia and Oceania 2011, 2015, 2016; Miss Supranational Asia 2022; Miss Internet 2011; Miss Talent 2014; Miss Photogenic 2022.
|-
| 
| 2013
| 9
| 2013-present
| Puteri Indonesia(Puteri Indonesia Pariwisata)
| 8
| 2nd runner-up
 Jesica Fitriana Martasari(2019)
| 2013
 Cokorda Istri Krisnanda Widani(3rd runner-up)
| 2022
 Adinda Cresheilla(3rd runner-up)
| Won Miss Supranational Asia 2021; Best National Costume 2014, 2015, 2018, 2021; Miss Internet 2016; Miss Elegance 2016; Best in Swimsuit 2017; Woman of Substance 2019; Supra Fan-Vote 2017 (via Vodi app), 2019, 2021; Miss Congeniality 2021; Supra Chat 2022.
|-
| 
| 2010
| 2
| 2010, 2013
| Miss Iraq
| 0
| -
| -
| -
| -
|-
| 
| 2010
| 6
| 2010, 2014-2015, 2019-present
| Miss Ireland
| 1
| Top 25
 Jessica VanGaalen(2019)
| 2019
 Jessica VanGaalen(Top 25)
| 2019
 Jessica VanGaalen(Top 25)
| -
|-
| 
| 2011
| 3
| 2011-2012, 2015
| Miss Israel
| 1
| Top 30
 Hodaya Cohen(2015)
| 2015
 Hodaya Cohen(Top 30)
| 2015
 Hodaya Cohen(Top 30)
| -
|-
| 
| 2010
| 6
| 2010, 2013-2015, 2017-2018
| Miss World Italy
| 1
| Top 25
 Barbara Storoni(2017)
| 2017
 Barbara Storoni (Top 25)
| 2017
 Barbara Storoni (Top 25)
| -
|-
| 
| 2013
| 3
| 2013, 2019, 2022-present
| Miss Côte d'Ivoire
| 0
| -
| -
| -
| -
|-
| 
| 2013
| 8
| 2013, 2015-present
| Miss Jamaica World
| 3
| Top 20
 Regina Harding(2015)
| 2015
 Regina Harding(Top 20)
| 2022
 Carisa Peart (Top 24)
| Won Miss Supranational Caribbean 2022.
|-
| 
| 2010
| 9
| 2010, 2014-present
| Miss World Japan
| 4
| Top 20
 Mieko Takeuchi(2015)
| 2015
 Mieko Takeuchi(Top 20)
| 2021
 Emiri Yanna Shimizu(Top 24)
| -
|-
| 
| 2009
| 3
| 2009, 2017, 2022-present
| Miss Kazakhstan
| 1
| Top 15
 Alina Sheptunova(2009)
| 2009
 Alina Sheptunova (Top 15)
| 2009
 Alina Sheptunova (Top 15)
| -
|-
| 
| 2014
| 7
| 2014-2015, 2017-present
| Miss World Kenya
| 3
| Top 12
 Roleen Mose(2022)
| 2015
 Margaret Muchemi(Top 20)
| 2022
 Roleen Mose (Top 12)
| Won Miss Supranational Africa 2021; Supra Influencer 2021; Supra Fan-Vote 2022.
|-
| 
| 2009
| 6
| 2009-2013, 2016
| Miss Universe Kosovo
| 0
| -
| -
| -
| -
|-
| 
| 2022
| 1
| 2022-present
| Miss Kyrgyzstan
| 0
| -
| -
| -
| -
|-
| 
| 2018
| 3
| 2018-2019, 2022-present
| Miss Universe Laos
| 0
| -
| -
| -
| Won Best National Costume 2018.
|-
| 
| 2009
| 5
| 2009-2011, 2013, 2015
| Miss Latvia
| 2
| Top 20
 Eva Caune(2011)
 Diana Kubasova(2013)
| 2011
 Eva Caune(Top 20)
| 2013
 Diana Kubasova(Top 20)
| -
|-
| 
| 2011
| 3
| 2011, 2014, 2018
| Miss Lebanon
| 1
| Top 20
 Daniella Rahme(2011)
| 2011
 Daniella Rahme(Top 20)
| 2011
 Daniella Rahme(Top 20)
| -
|-
| 
| 2022
| 1
| 2022-present
| Face of Lesotho
| 0
| -
| -
| -
| -
|-
| 
| 2009
| 6
| 2009-2012, 2015, 2019
| Miss Lithuania
| 1
| Top 20
 Eglė Štandtaitė-Brogienė(2010)
| 2010
 Eglė Štandtaitė-Brogienė (Top 20)
| 2010
 Eglė Štandtaitė-Brogienė (Top 20)
| -
|-
| 
| 2013
| 3
| 2013-2015
| Miss Luxembourg
| 1
| Top 20
 Heloise Paulmier(2013)
| 2013
 Heloise Paulmier (Top 20)
| 2013
 Heloise Paulmier (Top 20)
| -
|-
| 
| 2013
| 4
| 2013, 2015-2016, 2019
| Miss Macau
| 0
| -
| -
| -
| Won Miss Congeniality 2013.
|-
| 
| 2013
| 6
| 2013-2016, 2018, 2022-present
| Miss World Malaysia
| 3
| Top 10
 Tanisha Demour(2015)
| 2015
 Tanisha Demour(Top 10)
| 2022
 Melisha Lin(Top 24)
| Won Miss Talent 2013; Best Smile 2014.
|-
| 
| 2010
| 1
| 2010
| Miss Mali
| 0
| -
| -
| -
| -
|-
| 
| 2015
| 7
| 2015-present
| Miss World Malta
| 0
| -
| -
| -
| -
|-
| 
| 2013
| 1
| 2013
| Martinique Queens
| 0
| -
| -
| -
| -
|-
| 
| 2014
| 6
| 2014-2016, 2018-2019, 2022-present
| Miss Estrella Mauritius
| 3
| Top 12
 Alexandrine Belle-Étoile(2022)
| 2016
 Ambika Geetanjalee(Top 25)
| 2022
 Alexandrine Belle-Étoile(Top 12)
| Won Supranational Africa 2016, 2018, 2022; Miss Friendship 2015.
|-
| 
| 2010
| 10
| 2010, 2013-present
| Miss Mexico
| 6
| 1st runner-up
 Jacqueline Morales(2013)
| 2013
 Jacqueline Morales(1st runner-up)
| 2019
 Dariana Urista(Top 25)
| Won Miss Fashion City 2015; Best National Costume 2018, 2019.
|-
| 
| 2009
| 5
| 2009-2011, 2013, 2018
| Miss Moldova
| 1
| Top 15
 Ana Velesco(2009)
| 2009
 Ana Velesco (Top 15)
| 2009
 Ana Velesco (Top 15)
| Won Miss Top Model 2013.
|-
| 
| 2014
| 2
| 2014, 2016
| Miss World Mongolia
| 0
| -
| -
| -
| -
|-
| 
| 2012
| 2
| 2012, 2018
| Miss Montenegro
| 0
| -
| -
| -
| -
|-
| 
| 2014
| 2
| 2014-2015
| Miss Maroc
| 1
| Top 30
 Kawtar Riahi Idrissi(2015)
| 2015
 Kawtar Riahi Idrissi (Top 30)
| 2015
 Kawtar Riahi Idrissi (Top 30)'
| -
|-
| 
| 2023
| 1
| 2023-present
| Miss Mozambique
| 0
| -
| -
| -
| -
|-
| 
| 2013
| 7
| 2013-2019
| Miss Supranational Myanmar
| 5
| Top 10
 Han Thi(2014) Swe Zin Htet(2016)| 2013
 Khin Wint Wah(Top 20)| 2018
 Shwe Eain Si(Top 25)| Won Miss Internet 2013, 2014, 2015; Miss Supranational Asia and Oceania 2014; Best Evening Dress 2015.
|-
| 
| 2011
| 7
| 2011-2012, 2017-present
| Miss Namibia
| 3
| Winner
 Chanique Rabe(2021)| 2019
 Yana Haenisch(1st runner-up)| 2022
 Julita Kitwe (Top 24)| Won Miss Congeniality 2012; Best Body 2017.
|-
| 
| 2016
| 5
| 2016, 2018-present
| Miss Nepal
| 0
| -
| -
| -
| -
|-
| 
| 2010
| 11
| 2010-2011, 2013-present
| Miss Nederland
| 4
| Top 12
 Swelia Da Silva Antonio(2021)| 2016
 Milenka Janssen(Top 25)| 2021
 Swelia Da Silva Antonio (Top 12)| Won Miss Elegance 2019; Best Influencer 2019.
|-
| 
| 2010
| 7
| 2010-2011, 2013-2015, 2018-2019
| Miss Universe New Zealand
| 1
| Top 25
 Eva Louise Wilson(2019)| 2019
 Eva Louise Wilson (Top 25)| 2019
 Eva Louise Wilson (Top 25)| Won Miss Supranational Oceania 2019.
|-
| 
| 2013
| 1
| 2013
| Miss Nicaragua
| 0
| -
| -
| -
| Won Best National Costume 2013.
|-
| 
| 2010
| 10
| 2010-2013, 2015-2016, 2018-present
| Most Beautiful Girl in Nigeria
| 1
| Top 25
 Daniella Orumwense(2018)| 2018
 Daniella Orumwense (Top 25)| 2018
 Daniella Orumwense (Top 25)| -
|-
| 
| 2009
| 7
| 2009, 2011-2015, 2019
| Miss Northern Ireland
| 0
| -
| -
| -
| -
|-
| 
| 2010
| 2
| 2010-2012
| Miss Macedonia
| 0
| -
| -
| -
| -
|-
| 
| 2012
| 6
| 2012-2015, 2017, 2021
| Miss Norway
| 0
| -
| -
| -
| -
|-
| 
| 2018
| 1
| 2018
| Miss Pakistan
| 1
| Top 25
 Anzhelika Tahir(2018)| 2018
 Anzhelika Tahir(Top 25)| 2018
 Anzhelika Tahir(Top 25)| -
|-
| 
| 2009
| 13
| 2009-present
| Señorita Panamá
| 7
| Winner
  Karina Pinilla(2010)| 2010
  Karina Pinilla(Winner)| 2021
 Darelys Santos (Top 24)| Won Best National Costume 2010, 2017, 2018; Miss Supranational Americas 2012, 2015; Best Body 2015; Top Model 2021.
|-
| 
| 2010
| 8
| 2010, 2015-present
| Miss Paraguay
| 2
| Winner
 Stephania Stegman(2015)| 2015
 Stephania Stegman(Winner)| 2016
 Viviana Florentin (Top 25)| -

|-
| 
| 2009
| 10
| 2009-2011, 2014-2017, 2019-present
| Miss Peru
| 7
| 3rd runner-up
 Claudia Villafuerte(2010) Janick Maceta(2019)| 2009
 Nancy Gisella Cava Acuña (Top 15)| 2022
 Almendra Castillo (Top 12)| Won Best National Costume 2022.
|-
| 
| 2011
| 11
| 2011-present
| Miss World Philippines
| 10
| Winner
 Mutya Datul(2013)| 2012
 Elaine Moll(3rd runner-up)| 2022
 Alison Black(Top 24)| Won Miss Personality 2013; Miss Congeniality 2017; Miss Talent 2022.
|-
| 
| 2009
| 13
| 2009-present
| Miss Polski
| 13
| Winner
 Monika Lewczuk(2011)| 2009
 Klaudia Maria Ungerman (2nd runner-up)| 2022
 Agata Wdowiak (Top 12)| Won Miss Supranational Europe 2010, 2017, 2021, 2022; Miss Semilac 2017.
|-
| 
| 2010
| 12
| 2010-present
| Miss República Portuguesa
| 2
| Top 10
 Priscila Alves(2017)| 2010
 Olívia Ortiz(Top 20)| 2017
 Priscila Alves(Top 10)| Won Miss Elegance 2012; Miss Talent 2017.
|-
| 
| 2010
| 12
| 2010-present
| Miss World Puerto Rico
| 8
| Winner
 Valeria Vazquez(2018)| 2011
 Velery Veléz(2nd runner-up)| 2021
 Karla Guilfú(1st runner-up)| Won Miss Photogenic 2013; Miss Supranational Americas 2014; Top Model Americas 2021
|-
| 
| 2013
| 1
| 2013
| Miss Réunion
| 0
| -
| -
| -
| -
|-
| 
| 2009
| 13
| 2009-present
| Miss Universe Romania
| 7
| 3rd runner-up
 Bianca Tirsin(2017)| 2010
  Laura Barzoiu(Top 10)| 2022
 Andra Tache (Top 24)| Won Best Evening Dress 2016; Miss Supranational Europe 2018.
|-
| 
| 2009
| 10
| 2009-2011, 2013, 2015-2021
| Miss Russia
| 4
| Top 20
 Jana Dubnik(2013)| 2010
 Yevgeniya Shcherbakova(Top 20)| 2018
 Guzaliya Izmailova (Top 25)| Won Top Model 2009, 2010;Best Body 2016; Best National Costume 2018.
|-
| 
| 2011
| 10
| 2011-2021
| Miss Rwanda
| 2
| Top 20
 Sonia Gisa(2015)| 2015
 Sonia Gisa(Top 20)| 2016
 Colombe Akiwacu (Top 25)| Won Miss Personality 2012; Miss Supranational Africa 2015.
|-
| 
| 2014
| 2
| 2014, 2017
| Miss São Tomé and Príncipe
| 0
| -
| -
| -
| -
|-
| 
| 2009
| 8
| 2009-2010, 2012, 2014-2017, 2019
| Miss Scotland
| 0
| -
| -
| -
| Won Miss Talent 2010; Miss Congeniality 2019.
|-
| 
| 2010
| 5
| 2010-2013, 2017
| Miss Serbia
| 1
| Top 25
 Bojana Bojanić(2017)| 2017
 Bojana Bojanić (Top 25)| 2017
 Bojana Bojanić (Top 25)| -
|-
| 
| 2013
| 3
| 2013, 2019-2021
| Miss Sierra Leone
| 0
| -
| -
| -
| -
|-
| 
| 2011
| 7
| 2011, 2015-2019, 2022-present
| Miss Singapore World
| 1
| Top 25
 Naomi Huth(2019)| 2019
 Naomi Huth (Top 25)| 2019
 Naomi Huth (Top 25)| Won Miss Congeniality 2018; Miss Talent 2019.
|-
| 
| 2009
| 11
| 2009-2011, 2013, 2015-present
| Miss Universe Slovenskej Republiky
| 4
| Top 10
 Petra Denkova(2015) Lenka Tekeljakova(2016)| 2009
 Linda Mosatova (Top 15)| 2018
 Katarina Oeovanova (Top 25)| Won Miss Supranational Europe 2009.
|-
| 
| 2009
| 6
| 2009-2012, 2014, 2018
| Miss Slovenia
| 2
| 2nd runner-up
 Sandra Marinović(2010)| 2010
 Sandra Marinović(2nd runner-up)| 2011
 Suzana Matic (Top 20)| Won Miss Photogenic 2010.
|-
| 
| 2011
| 9
| 2011-2013, 2016-Present
| Miss South Africa
| 4
| Winner
 Lalela Mswane(2022)| 2011
 Dhesha Jeram(Top 20)| 2022
 Lalela Mswane(Winner)| Won Miss Supranational Africa 2011, 2012.
|-
| 
| 2010
| 8
| 2010, 2014, 2016-present
| Miss Queen Korea
| 2
| Winner
 Jenny Kim(2017)| 2010
 Yu Soo-jung(Top 10)| 2017
 Jenny Kim(Winner)| Won Miss Supranational Asia and Oceania 2010; Miss Talent 2018; Best National Costume 2018.
|-
| 
| 2017
| 2
| 2017, 2021
| Miss South Sudan
| 1
| Top 25
 Anyier Deng Yuol(2017)| 2017
 Anyier Deng Yuol (Top 25)| 2017
 Anyier Deng Yuol (Top 25)| Won Miss Supranational Africa 2017; Top Model Africa 2021.
|-
| 
| 2010
| 11
| 2010, 2012-present
| RNB España
| 3
| Top 10
 Celia Vallespir Garcia(2014)| 2012
 Nieves Sánchez Rodríguez(Top 20)| 2015
 Raquel Bonilla (Top 30)| Won Miss Warsaw Expo 2015; Miss Elegance 2017.
|-
| 
| 2013
| 3
| 2013, 2016, 2019
| Miss World Sri Lanka
| 1
| 3rd runner-up
 Ornella Mariam Gunesekere(2016)| 2016
 Ornella Mariam Gunesekere (3rd runner-up)| 2016
 Ornella Mariam Gunesekere (3rd runner-up)| -
|-
| 
| 2011
| 10
| 2011-2021
| Miss Suriname
| 2
| 2nd runner-up
 Jaleesa Pigot(2016)| 2012
 Periskia Maria Andrea Laing(Top 10)| 2016
 Jaleesa Pigot(2nd runner-up)| Won Miss Photogenic 2016; Miss Supranational Caribbean 2018.
|-
| 
| 2010
| 9
| 2010-2016, 2018, 2021
| Miss Sweden
| 1
| Top 20
 Ida Ovmar(2014)| 2014
 Ida Ovmar(Top 20)| 2014
 Ida Ovmar(Top 20)| Won Miss Elegance 2010, 2013; Best Body 2011; Miss Bikini 2014
|-
| 
| 2013
| 6
| 2013-2018
|Miss Universe Switzerland
| 1
| Top 20
 Mylene Clavien(2014)| 2014
 Mylene Clavien(Top 20)| 2014
 Mylene Clavien(Top 20)| -
|-
| 
| 2009
| 3
| 2009-2010, 2015
| Miss Taiwan
| 1
| Top 15
 Liu Xiao’ou(2009)| 2009
 Liu Xiao’ou(Top 15)| 2009
 Liu Xiao’ou(Top 15)| Won Miss Supranational Asia and Oceania 2009.
|-
| 
| 2010
| 12
| 2010-present
| Mister and Miss Supranational Thailand
| 8
| Winner
 Anntonia Porsild(2019)| 2010
 Maythavee Burapasing(4th runner-up)| 2022
 Praewwanich Ruangthong(1st runner-up)| Won Miss Internet 2012.
|-
| 
| 2011
| 3
| 2011, 2013, 2018
| Miss Togo
| 0
| -
| -
| -
| -
|-
| 
| 2014
| 6
| 2014-2016, 2019-present
| Miss Trinidad and Tobago
| 5
| Top 20
 Yia-Loren Gomez(2014)| 2014
 Tinnitia Griffith(Top 20)| 2022
 Christin Coeppicus (Top 24)| Won Supra Chat 2021.
|-
| 
| 2010
| 11
| 2010-2019, 2022-present
| Miss Turkey
| 1
| 2nd runner-up
 Leyla Köse(2013)| 2013
 Leyla Köse (2nd runner-up)| 2013
 Leyla Köse (2nd runner-up)| Won Miss Elegance 2022.
|-
| 
| 2009
| 10
| 2009-2011, 2013-2016, 2018-2019, 2022-present
| Miss Ukraine
| 5
| Winner
 Oksana Moria(2009)| 2009
 Oksana Moria(Winner)| 2018
 Snizhana Tanchuk (Top 25)| Won Miss Photogenic 2009, 2011.
|-
| 
| 2013
| 2
| 2013, 2022-present
| Miss Uruguay
| 0
| -
| -
| -
| -
|-
| 
| 2011
| 11
| 2011-present
| Miss Supranational USA
| 5
| 1st runner-up
 Katrina Dimaranan(2018)| 2011
 Krystelle Khoury(4th runner-up)| 2019
 Regina Gray (Top 10)| Won Miss Fashion World 2014; Best Body 2018; Miss Supranational Americas 2019.
|-
| 
| 2011
| 3
| 2011, 2013, 2019
| Miss US Virgin Islands
| 1
| 4th runner-up
 Esonica Veira(2013)| 2013
 Esonica Veira (4th runner-up)| 2013
 Esonica Veira (4th runner-up)| -
|-
| 
| 2009
| 13
| 2009-present
| Miss Venezuela
| 7
| 1st runner-up
 Valeria Vespoli (2016)| 2010
 Laksmi Rodríguez(Top 20)| 2022
 Ismelys Velásquez (4th runner-up)| Won Miss Supranational Americas 2010, 2016; Best Evening Dress 2017; Miss Photogenic 2018; Supra Chat 2021.
|-
| 
| 2009
| 9
| 2009, 2011-2012, 2015-2019, 2022-present
| Miss Supranational Vietnam
| 8
| 2nd runner-up
 Nguyễn Huỳnh Kim Duyên(2022)| 2009
 Chung Thuc Quyen Ngen Tot(Top 15)| 2022
 Nguyễn Huỳnh Kim Duyên (2nd runner-up)| Won Miss Internet 2009, 2017; Best National Costume 2009, 2016, 2018; Miss Supranational Asia and Oceania 2012; Miss Supranational Asia 2018, 2019; Miss St. George 2012; Miss Social Media 2015; Best Evening Dress 2018; Supra Chat 2022.
|-
| 
| 2010
| 9
| 2010-2017, 2019
| Miss Wales
| 1
| Top 25
 Rachel Tate(2017)| 2017
 Rachel Tate(Top 25)| 2017
 Rachel Tate(Top 25)| -
|-
| 
| 2019
| 2
| 2019, 2022-present
| Miss Zambia
| 0
| -
| -
| -
| -
|-
| 
| 2011
| 4
| 2011, 2013, 2017, 2022-present
| Miss Zimbabwe
| 0
| -
| -
| -
| -
|-
|}

National franchises
National franchises have a lot of latitude in choosing candidates for Miss Supranational. Some are the winners of individual contests for their Miss Supranational, others get the honor by winning first or second runner-up from contests for candidates to multiple international pageants, and yet others are chosen in different ways.

Australia
Alecia McCallum won Miss Supranational Australia 2018 in a stand-alone pageant.

Croatia
Tihana Babij won Miss Supranational Croatia 2018 after defeating 17 regional Croatia contestants; she herself comes from Vienna and was the representative of the Croatian diaspora.

Ecuador
Justeen Cruz was picked Miss Supranational Ecuador 2020 via an online competition due to the COVID-19 pandemic.

Gibraltar
Aisha Benyahya became Miss Supranational Gibraltar 2016 after winning second place at Miss Gibraltar.

India
Asha Bhat, Miss Supranational India 2014, and the eventual winner of Miss Supranational 2014, had been second runner up at Miss Diva 2014. Srinidhi Shetty was crowned Miss supranational 2016 After winning Miss Diva Supranational Crown in 2016 alongside India's representative to Mr Supranational Jitesh Thakur also won Second Runner up title who was also send by Times group and Altamash Faraz became Mister Supranational India 2017.after placing second runner-up in Mr India 2016. In 2018 India won Mr Supranational with Prathamesh making India the only country till date to win both subsidiaries.Shefali Sood became the Miss Supranational India 2019 representative at Miss Diva 2019. Aavriti Choudhary won Miss India Supranational 2020 during Miss Diva 2020.

Indonesia

Puteri Indonesia Pariwisata (literally translates into: "Princess Indonesia Tourism" or "Miss Supranational Indonesia") is one of the titles granted by the Puteri Indonesia beauty pageant. The winners of Puteri Indonesia Pariwisata represent Indonesia in Miss Supranational. The president-owner of Puteri Indonesia Pariwisata are The Royal Highest Family of Surakarta Sunanate, Princess Mooryati Soedibyo and Princess Putri Kuswisnuwardhani.

Puteri Indonesia Pariwisata is traditionally crowned in March, alongside the celebration of International Women's Day. The first Puteri Indonesia Pariwisata to compete in Miss Supranational was Cokorda Istri Krisnanda Widani from Bali in 2013. The 2011 and 2012 winners (Alessandra Khadijah Usman and Andi Tenri Gusti Harnum Utari Natassa) competed in Miss Asia Pacific World. The participation of Indonesia in Miss Supranational were continuing by Intan Aletrino became Miss Supranational Indonesia 2016 by winning Puteri Indonesia Pariwisata 2016. Karina Nadila Niab was Miss Supranational Indonesia 2017 after winning Puteri Indonesia Pariwisata 2017, and since then the winner of Puteri Indonesia Pariwisata was automatically represent Indonesia to Miss Supranational till now.

In 2019, Joko Widodo announced the Puteri Indonesia Organization as "National Intangible Cultural Heritage of Indonesia"'', which carries the values of Indonesian culture and society togetherness, to celebrate the role of women in the creative industry, environment, tourism, education and social awareness. In line with that, Angela Tanoesoedibjo the eldest daughter of media magnate MNC Group Hary Tanoesoedibjo and Miss Indonesia President and Chief Executive Officer Liliana Tanaja Tanoesoedibjo chosen as The Deputy of Ministry of tourism and Creative Economy of The Republic of Indonesia by the President of Indonesia, Joko Widodo at the Istana Negara Palace in Central Jakarta. Generally, the final coronation night of the pageant was annually broadcast on Indosiar, but the 2007 and 2019–present edition was broadcast on SCTV, which means both of SCM Network Televisions is the official broadcaster of Puteri Indonesia.

The reigning Puteri Indonesia Pariwisata 2020 is Jihane Almira Chedid of Central Java, who was crowned on 6 March 2020 in Jakarta Convention Center. She will represent Indonesia at the 12th edition of Miss Supranational 2021 beauty pageant.

Gallery of winners: The winners of Puteri Indonesia Pariwisata (Miss Supranational Indonesia)

Jamaica
Franz Christie was chosen Mister Supranational Jamaica 2017 at the United Nations Pageants, separately from and before the Miss Supranational Jamaica candidate. Rayon Davis and Kimberly Dawkins were chosen Mister and Miss Jamaica Supranational 2019 together.

Japan
Yurika Nakamoto was selected Miss Supranational Japan 2018, defeating 30 candidates, at the same pageant that also selected Miss United Continents Japan 2018, and Miss Asia Pacific International Japan 2018.

Laos
Kithsada Vongsaysavath was selected Miss Supranational Lao 2017 after winning second runner-up at Miss Grand Laos 2017.

Mauritius
Urvashi Hureeram became Miss Supranational Mauritius 2019 as first runner-up to Miss Universe Mauritius 2019.

Nigeria
Oluchi Kalu became Miss Supranational Nigeria 2019 after being first runner-up at the 2019 Beauty of Africa International Pageant.

In August 2021, The Beauty of Africa International Pageant, terminated their contract in sending contestant to Miss Supranational due to the alleged ceaseless discrimination of African contestant and continual increase in their license fees according to the Nigerian national pageant director, Daniel Opuene. The Most Beautiful Girl in Nigeria pageant began selecting candidates for Miss Supranational Nigeria since 2021.

Philippines

When Elaine Kay Moll won first runner-up in Binibining Pilipinas 2012, she didn't expect to be sent to Miss Supranational in Poland, but she was sent, and won third runner-up. Jehza Mae Huelar won Miss Philippines Supranational 2018, due to getting second runner-up in Binibining Pilipinas 2018. Resham Saeed was Miss Supranational Philippines 2019, after getting second runner-up in Binibining Pilipinas 2019. The Philippine Miss Supranational contest franchise moved from Binibining Pilipinas to Miss World Philippines in 2020.

Myanmar
Khin Wint Wah was selected as the first Miss Supranational Myanmar, in 2013, by defeating 99 other contestants in a general knowledge test, rather than a beauty contest. Swe Zin Htet became Miss Supranational Myanmar 2016 by winning the Miss Golden Land Myanmar contest, which also sent contestants to Miss Earth, Miss Intercontinental, Face of Beauty International, Miss Tourism International and Miss Globe.

Nepal
Santosh Upadhyaya won the first Mister Supra-star Search 2020, and was given the first Mister Supranational Nepal 2021 title. He will represent Nepal in 5th edition of Mister Supranational 2021 in Poland.

Rwanda
Aurore Mutesi Kayibanda competed in Miss Supranational 2013 after winning Miss Rwanda 2012. Shanita Munyana won Miss Supranational Rwanda in 2019, winning Rwf1 million.

South Africa
Belinde Schroeder was crowned Miss Supranational South Africa 2018. The Miss South Africa pageant also began selecting candidates for Miss Supranational South Africa in 2020.

Trinidad & Tobago
Yia-Loren Gomez was the first Miss Trinidad and Tobago Supranational in 2019.

United States
In the United States, there are statewide Miss Supranational titles. Angela Ritossa was Miss Ohio Supranational 2017 before competing for Miss Supranational United States.

Since February 2018, the Miss Supranational USA franchise has been owned and directed by Cecilio Asuncion, founder of transgender modeling agency Slay Model Management.

Vietnam
Nguyễn Thị Ngọc Châu became the frist official Miss Supranational Vietnam after winning in 2018, and placed Top 10 at Miss Supranational 2019.

Since 2022, the Miss Supranational Vietnam franchise has been owned by Uni Media.

See also 
 List of beauty contests

References 

International beauty pageants
Recurring events established in 2009
Recurring events established in 2016
2009 establishments in Panama
2009 establishments in Poland
2016 establishments in Poland